Dr Francisco José de Lacerda e Almeida (1753 – 18 October 1798) was a colonial Brazilian-born Portuguese explorer in the 18th century.

He was the son of Portuguese captain José António de Lacerda and Francisca de Almeida Pais.

"He spent ten years in Brazil, where he discovered new species of plants and animals, along with Indian tribes previously unknown to Europeans."

In 1798, he led a Portuguese expedition to the Kazembe region of Zambia. After his death on this mission, the group was led by Francisco Pinto.

Works

References 

1753 births
1798 deaths
18th-century explorers
18th-century Portuguese people
Explorers of Africa
Portuguese explorers of South America
University of Coimbra alumni